Stefan Willemse (born 12 April 1992) is a South African professional rugby union player for the  in the Currie Cup and in the Rugby Challenge. His regular position is flanker or lock.

Career

Youth and Varsity rugby

He made just three substitute appearances for the  side in the 2012 Under-21 Provincial Championship competition, with an ankle injury curtailing his progress.

Willemse then made the move to Port Elizabeth, where he joined Varsity Cup side . He was a key player for the team during the 2013 and 2014, helping them reach the semi-finals of the competition on both occasions.

He also made a single appearance for the  side in their promotion/relegation play-off match against the  side, but could not help the team win promotion to Division A.

Eastern Province Kings

At the conclusion of the 2013 Varsity Cup, Willemse was included in the  squad for the 2013 Vodacom Cup, and made his first class debut against .

He made two appearances for the Kings during the 2014 Vodacom Cup, as the Kings finished fifth in the Southern Section to miss out on a play-off spot. In June 2014, he was selected on the bench for the  side to face  during their 2014 tour of South Africa. He came on just before the hour mark as the Kings suffered a 12–34 defeat. He made his debut in the Premier Division of the Currie Cup during the 2014 season; he started their opening match of the season against  in Port Elizabeth and played in the first eight rounds of the competition before an AC joint injury ruled him out of the last two rounds.

References

Eastern Province Elephants players
Living people
1992 births
Southern Kings players
South African rugby union players
Rugby union flankers
Pumas (Currie Cup) players
Rugby ATL players
Griquas (rugby union) players
Rugby union players from the Western Cape